Laqueoceras is an extinct genus of cephalopod belonging to the Ammonite subclass. They were fast-moving nektonic carnivores.

References

Psiloceratidae
Ammonitida genera
Jurassic ammonites
Hettangian life